Andreas Alfred Glarner (born 9 October 1962) is a Swiss businessman and politician. He currently serves as a member of the National Council (Switzerland) for the Swiss People's Party (SVP), he was also a former member of the Grand Council of Aargau from 2001 to 2015. His archconservative politics can be allocated to the right-wing of his political party. He is primarily known for his immigration politics and the retention of independence, with a certain similarity to the politics of James Schwarzenbach.

Early life and education 
Glarner was born on 9 October 1962 to Hans Rudolf Glarner, a carpenter. His mother (née; Boss) was a laboratory assistant. His father would later be convicted of racial discrimination due to his racist comments that became public through documentary format by SRF. His father and grandfather were active members of the Social Democratic Party of Switzerland (SP), the grandfather was a member of the city council of Bremgarten. In 1974, his parents divorced and he primarily grew-up living with his mother in Dietikon. He attended the local schools and subsequently completed an apprenticeship as ventilation plumber. After his initial formation years he sought continuing education in Business Administration.

Career 
In 1984, he began to work for Rohner Ventilationsspenglerei AG (a ventilation plumbing company) in Urdorf. He became the general manager in 1987 at the age of 25. In 1991, he left to start his own company in Oberwil-Lieli, initially a sole proprietorship called Airproduct Andreas Glarner, later becoming a stock corporation which he subsequently sold to Galenica in 2017. The business was primarily active in the trading of care products such as wheelchairs, and crutches. Through this venture, he became a self-made millionaire at age 45.

Today, Glarner holds several participations in trading as well as real estate. He is a member of the board of several stock corporations and LLCs, namely; Omnitrade Handels AG, a trading company, based in Oberwil-Lieli, Vinotrade AG, a wine trading firm, in Oberwil-Lieli, nature products Switzerland llc, a cosmetics trading firm, in Oberwil-Lieli as well as the real estate firms 5620.ch GmbH, Bieri Verwaltungs AG and Kaeser, Glarner & Partner. From 1995 to its dissolution he was the president of the Aargauische Vaterländische Vereinigung (en. Argovian Fatherland Association), a right-wing nationalist association. He is currently the president of sifa - Sicherheit für Alle.

Politics 
Between 2001 and 2015 he served as a member of the Grand Council of Aargau, where he presided the parliamentary group of the Swiss People's Party from 2005 to 2015. Between 1998 and 2017 he served on the municipal council of Oberwil-Lieli, since 2006 as mayor.

Since 2015, he serves as National Councillor on the National Council.

References

External links 
 Andreas Glarner on parl.ch 
 Official Website of Andreas Glarner

Living people
1962 births
Swiss businesspeople
Members of the National Council (Switzerland)
Swiss People's Party politicians
Mayors of places in Switzerland
21st-century Swiss politicians
People from Glarus